Admiral of the Fleet Alfred Ernle Montacute Chatfield, 1st Baron Chatfield,  (27 September 1873 – 15 November 1967) was a Royal Navy officer. During the First World War he was present as Sir David Beatty's Flag-Captain at the Battle of Heligoland Bight in August 1914, at the Battle of Dogger Bank in January 1915 and at the Battle of Jutland in May 1916. After the war he became Commander-in-Chief, Atlantic Fleet and then Commander-in-Chief, Mediterranean Fleet before serving as First Sea Lord in the mid-1930s in which role he won arguments that the Royal Navy should have 70 cruisers rather than the 50 cruisers that had been agreed at the Naval Conference of 1930, that the battleship still had an important role to play despite the development of the bomber and that the Fleet Air Arm should be part of the Royal Navy rather than the Royal Air Force. He subsequently served as Minister for Coordination of Defence in the early years of the Second World War.

Naval career

Early naval career
Born the only son of Admiral Alfred John Chatfield and Louisa Chatfield (née Faulconer), Chatfield was educated at St Andrew's School in Tenby before he entered the Royal Navy as a cadet in the training ship HMS Britannia in 1886. He went to sea as a midshipman in the corvette HMS Cleopatra in November 1888 before transferring to the cruiser HMS Warspite, flagship of the Pacific Station, in 1890. Promoted to sub-lieutenant on 27 September 1892 and to lieutenant on 27 March 1894, he joined the battleship HMS Royal Sovereign, flagship of the Channel Fleet in May 1894. He attended the gunnery school HMS Excellent in 1895 and then joined the staff at the gunnery school HMS Cambridge at Devonport in August 1897. Chatfield became gunnery officer in the battleship HMS Caesar in the Mediterranean Fleet in January 1899 and then joined the staff of the gunnery school HMS Wildfire at Sheerness in January 1900 before becoming 1st lieutenant and gunnery officer in the cruiser HMS Good Hope in the Atlantic Fleet in November 1902. Promoted to commander on 1 January 1904, he transferred to the battleship HMS Venerable in the Mediterranean Fleet in January 1904.

He returned to HMS Excellent in March 1906 and, having been promoted to captain on 30 June 1909, he became Flag Captain of the battleship HMS Albemarle, flagship of Rear-Admiral Sir Colin Keppel, second-in-command of the Atlantic Fleet, in September 1909 and then Flag Captain of the battleship HMS London, Keppel's new flagship in the same role, in February 1910. After attending the War course at the Royal Naval War College at Portsmouth, he served as Captain of the converted liner RMS Medina for the Royal Tour of India in 1911 and was appointed to the Royal Victorian Order as a Commander in February 1912. He was then given command first of HMS Aboukir in the Reserve Fleet in Summer 1912, then of the cruiser HMS Southampton in September 1912 and subsequently of the battlecruiser HMS Lion, flagship of Rear-Admiral David Beatty's First Battlecruiser Squadron, in March 1913.

First World War

During the First World War Chatfield was present as Beatty's Flag-Captain in the Lion at the Battle of Heligoland Bight in August 1914, at the Battle of Dogger Bank in January 1915 and at the Battle of Jutland in May 1916. It was at Jutland, after two British battlecruisers had blown up, that Beatty made his famous remark, "There seems to be something wrong with our bloody ships today". Appointed to the Order of St Michael and St George as a Companion on 31 May 1916 and to the Order of the Bath as a Companion in the 1916 Birthday Honours, Chatfield went on to command the battleship HMS Iron Duke, Beatty's flagship as Commander-in-Chief of the Grand Fleet, in November 1916 and then the battleship , Beatty's new flagship in the same role, in February 1917. He was advanced to Knight Commander of the Order of St Michael and St George on 5 April 1919.

Senior command
After the war Chatfield served as Fourth Sea Lord from July 1919 and, having been appointed Naval Aide-de-Camp to the King on 26 January 1920 and promoted to rear-admiral on 31 July 1920, he became Assistant Chief of the Naval Staff in February 1920. Advanced to Knight Commander of the Order of the Bath in the 1922 Birthday Honours, he was appointed Commander of the 3rd Light Cruiser Squadron in September 1922 and Third Sea Lord and Controller of the Navy in April 1925. Promoted to vice-admiral on 1 March 1926, he went on to be Commander-in-Chief, Atlantic Fleet, with his flag in the battleship HMS Nelson, in March 1929 and, having been promoted to full admiral on 1 April 1930, he became Commander-in-Chief, Mediterranean Fleet, with his flag in the battleship HMS Queen Elizabeth, in May 1930.

Chatfield became First Sea Lord in January 1933 and was advanced to Knight Grand Cross of the Order of the Bath in the 1934 New Year Honours. As First Sea Lord he won arguments that the Royal Navy should have 70 cruisers rather than the 50 cruisers that had been agreed at the London Naval Conference 1930, that the battleship still had an important role to play despite the development of the bomber and that the Fleet Air Arm should be part of the Royal Navy rather than the Royal Air Force.

He was promoted to Admiral of the Fleet on 3 May 1935 and, having taken part in the funeral of King George V in January 1936 and the coronation of King George VI in May 1937, he was raised to the peerage as Baron Chatfield of Ditchling in the County of Sussex on 11 June 1937. He retired from the Royal Navy in August 1938.

In late 1938 Chatfield chaired the Expert Committee on the Defence of India which, using the work of the 1938 Auchinleck Committee, recommended that the arena of India's defence should be re-focussed more on her sea communications and less or her North-Western Land Frontier as well as the modernisation of the British Indian Army, the re-equipment of the RAF squadrons and the re-stocking of war stores.

Minister for Coordination of Defence

Having been appointed to the Order of Merit in the 1939 New Year Honours, in February Chatfield succeeded Sir Thomas Inskip as Minister for Coordination of Defence in the government of Neville Chamberlain, despite having a non-political background. He was sworn of the Privy Council at the same time.

In March 1939 Chatfield urged an increase in munition production: "Would it not be possible to put industry on a war production basis immediately, not necessarily at the expense of our export trade but by curtailing internal consumption?" However the President of the Board of Trade, Oliver Stanley, objected: "Such a step would be almost revolutionary, and must be proved absolutely essential before introduction".

On 11 April 1939 the Foreign Policy Committee decided that the question of Russia's potential as an ally should be referred to the Chiefs of Staff. Chatfield said that it was clear the political arguments against a Russian alliance outweighed any possible military benefits and that the Chiefs of Staff should only report on Russia's military capability. On 24 April 1939 the Chiefs of Staff submitted their report and rated Russia's military effectiveness low. The next day Chatfield gave the Cabinet Committee on Foreign Policy a summary of this report: "Russia, although a great Power for other purposes, was only a Power of medium rank for military purposes...Her assistance would be of considerable, though not of great, military value". On 16 May 1939 Lord Halifax said that the political reasons for not allying with Russia were stronger than the strategic reasons for such an alliance. Chatfield responded: "...if for fear of making an alliance with Russia we drove that country into the German camp we should have made a mistake of vital and far-reaching importance".

Chatfield resigned as Minister for Coordination of Defence in April 1940 and subsequently chaired a committee on the evacuation of London's hospitals. He retired to his home at Farnham Common in Buckinghamshire and became Deputy Lieutenant of that county on 15 June 1951. He died at his home there on 15 November 1967.

Family
In July 1909 he married Lillian Emma Matthews (d.1977); they had two daughters and a son. Their son, Ernle, succeeded his father as Baron Chatfield. He followed him into the Royal Navy, serving as Aide-de-Camp to the Governor General of Canada between 1940 and 1945. The 2nd Baron settled in Victoria, British Columbia. Their elder daughter, Angela (Lady Donner) married Sir Patrick Donner MP. Their younger daughter, Katharine, married Henry Duckworth, son of Sir George Duckworth.

Arms

References

Sources

Further reading

External links

 Transcription of Official Service Records on www.admirals.org.uk

 

|-

|-

|-

|-

1873 births
1967 deaths
Commanders of the Royal Victorian Order
Deputy Lieutenants of Buckinghamshire
Ernle family
First Sea Lords and Chiefs of the Naval Staff
Knights Commander of the Order of St Michael and St George
Knights Grand Cross of the Order of the Bath
Lords of the Admiralty
Members of the Order of Merit
Members of the Privy Council of the United Kingdom
Ministers in the Chamberlain peacetime government, 1937–1939
Ministers in the Chamberlain wartime government, 1939–1940
Barons created by George VI
People from Southsea
Royal Navy admirals of the fleet
Royal Navy officers of World War I
Military personnel from Portsmouth